Hulftegg Pass (el. 954 m.) is a mountain pass between the cantons of Zürich and St. Gallen in Switzerland.

It connects Mühlrüti in the municipality of Mosnang and Steg in the municipality of Fischenthal in the Töss Valley.

The pass lies between the Toggenburg in St. Gallen and the valley of the Töss River in Zürich. The pass road has a maximum grade of 10 percent. At the summit is a popular restaurant. From the pass, there are hiking trails to climb the surrounding peaks, including the Hörnli and the Schnebelhorn.

Mountain passes of Switzerland
Mountain passes of the canton of St. Gallen
St. Gallen–Zürich border